The Neighborhoodshittalka is the second album by Detroit rapper Dice. Released in 1996, the album is Dice's only release on Reel Life Productions, following appearances on other albums by the label, including Natas' Doubelievengod and Mastamind's EP Lickkuidrano, Dice estimated that the album sold 200,000 copies, and claims to have received no royalties from the album.

Legacy 

The album was reissued in 1999 with distribution by Overture Music, the parent company to Reel Life's successor, Gothom/Overcore. Russell Culvin, the founder of Fallen Angelz Entertainment, which Dice cofounded in 2000, stated in a 2006 interview that he wanted to purchase the rights to the album from Reel Life cofounder James Smith, who was in prison at the time. As of 2011, The Neighborhoodshittalka is now available at http://dicestore.bigcartel.com/.

Track listing

References

External links 
 The Neighborhoodshittalka on Allmusic
 The Neighborhoodshittalka on Discogs

1996 albums
Albums produced by Esham
Dice (rapper) albums
Reel Life Productions albums